Frank Sauer (born 21 March 1954) is a Canadian retired international soccer player.

Club career
He played at club level for the New York Cosmos. Before he went to New York he played with London City in the National Soccer League.

International career
Sauer made his debut for Canada in an October 1973 friendly match against Luxembourg and earned a total of 4 caps, scoring no goals. His final international was an April 1974 friendly against Bermuda.

References

1954 births
Living people
Canadian soccer players
Canada men's international soccer players
New York Cosmos players
London City players
Canadian National Soccer League players
Association footballers not categorized by position